enRoute is the in-flight magazine and entertainment system of Air Canada. All content in the print magazine, as well as the website, is published in both French and English by Spafax. The magazine has offices in both Montreal, Quebec. and Toronto, Ontario.

Distribution
The magazine is offered for free on all Air Canada aircraft and in its Maple Leaf Lounges, as well as on their website. The publisher of the magazine is Spafax Canada Inc. As well as the magazine, enRoute is the name given to Air Canada's in-flight entertainment programme of movies, television, radio and short films, available on most flights.

History
In August 2019, Sydney Loney was the Executive Editor until August 2020 when she became the editor-in-chief,. In the past, Ilana Weitzman served as the editor-in-chief of the magazine until July 2015 when she was replaced by Jean-François Légaré. Stefanie Sosiak serves as Art Director (as of October 2015).

Social media
enRoute Magazine has accounts on Twitter, Instagram, Facebook, YouTube, Pinterest and Tiktok.

Awards
In 2020, enRoute Magazine won 4 Golds and 2 Bronzes at the 29th annual NATJA Awards, including top honours for best Travel Magazine for the September 2020 Food Issue. In May 2012 cnn.com named it as the best inflight magazine worldwide. In 2009, enRoute won 10 awards at the Canadian National Magazine Awards.

Canada's Best New Restaurants
Canada's Best New Restaurants is an annual program run by enRoute Magazine, and has been featured in a dedicated Food Issue every year since 2002. The program consists of travelling across Canada, trying new restaurants in each province and eventually ranking a top 10, to promote and support Canada's culinary talent.

References

External links

Air Canada
Monthly magazines published in Canada
Travel magazines published in Canada
Inflight magazines
Magazines with year of establishment missing
Tourism magazines
Magazines published in Montreal
French-language magazines published in Canada